Bryn Atkinson (born 9 December 1982, Canberra, Australian Capital Territory) is an Australian professional mountain bike racing cyclist from Townsville, QLD. He started mountain biking in 1996 and became a professional in 2002. Bryn's first introduction to the sport was through his local mountain bike club in Townsville- The Townsville Rockwheelers. Competing in several cross country type events, Bryn evolved with the sport and later found downhill. As a teenager, he moved north to Cairns, a popular location for downhill mountain biking, and host of the UCI Mountain Bike World Championships in 1996. Glen Jacobs was the course builder for that event and several other events on the World Cup, and mentored Bryn and several other downhillers in the area.

The first Australian competitors to travel overseas and race world cups with success were Michael Ronning, Scott Sharples, Sean Mccarroll, Tai Lee Muxlow, Katrina Miller, Wade Boots, etc.. Scott Sharples would later become Bryn's coach.

Royal/ Orange was the first international Downhill team Bryn raced for in 2002. In 2003, as a member of yet another Aussie Invasion, he joined Rennie, Hill and Graves on the MadCatz/Iron Horse team and started scaring people worldwide with his raw-power cornering and flat-out speed. In 2005 Bryn signed with GT Bicycles for four years. In 2009 he and his girlfriend (now Wife), Jill Kintner formed a privateer program with Crankbrothers and Intense Bicycles. In 2010-11 he rode for Transition Bicycles out of Ferndale, Wa, and is teammates with Jill Kintner, and Lars Sternberg.

Since retiring from full-time racing, Bryn has maintained his superhuman bike handling skills, but added pro-level filming and photography to his toolkit, leveraging the power of the internet and social media to stay visible while doing what he loves.
 
He currently resides in Bellingham, Washington.

Palmarès 

2002
7th DH, Australian National Mountain Biking Championships

2003
4th DH, Australian National Mountain Biking Championships
9th 4X, Norba Series, Round 4 USA
10th DH, Oceania MTB Championships  AUS
10th DH, Norba Series, Round 5 USA

2004
6th 4X, Norba Series, Round 3 USA
8th DH, Norba Series, Round 3 USA
5th DH, Norba Series, Round 5 USA
9th DH, Norba Series, Round 6 USA
4th DH, Norba Series, Round 7 USA
10th 4X, Norba Series, Round 7 USA
8th DH, Norba Series Final USA

2005
4th 4X, Sea Otter
2nd Pro Slalom, Sea Otter
10th DH, Sea Otter
3rd 4X, Norba Series, Round 5 USA
6th DH, National Series Final VIC
7th DH, UCI Mountain Bike & Trials World Championships, ITA
9th DH, MTB World Cup CAN

2006 
2nd DH, Australian National Mountain Biking Championships
7th DH MTB World Cup, Round 5 BRA
 13th DH MTB World Championships Rotorua, New Zealand

2007
1st US Open
3rd 4X Oceania Championships ACT
4th DH Oceania Championships AUS
9th 4X MTB World Cup, Round 2 SUI

2008
3rd US Open
9th DH MTB World Cup, Round 6, Canberra, Australia
2nd DH, Australian National Mountain Biking Championships

2009
8th UCI World Cup Val nord, Andorra

2010
2nd DH National Thredbo, NSW
1st Pro Gravity Tour #1 Port Angeles, WA
12th UCI World Cup #1, Maribor, Slovenia
2nd Pro Gravity Tour #2 Platekill, NY
16th UCI World Cup Ft. William, Scotland
2nd Pro GRT #3 Northstar Tahoe, CA
20th UCI World Cup Champery, SUI
18th UCI World Cup Val Di Sole, ITA
1st Overall Pro Gravity Tour Series
21st Overall UCI World Cup Series
1st Newtons Nation Bathurst, AUS

2011
1st DH Mt. Buller, AUS MTB Series
4th DH, Australian National Mountain Biking Championships

2012
7th DH, Australian National Mountain Biking Championships

References 
 Profile on MTB Data

External links 
Interview

SEA OTTER
 https://web.archive.org/web/20110412040834/http://dirt.mpora.com/news/dirttv-sea-otter-classic-2010-friday.html
 http://www.pinkbike.com/news/transition-bikes-sea-otter-2010.html

PRO GRT/NDUB CUP
 http://www.pinkbike.com/news/progrt-round1-photos-2010.html
 http://www.vitalmtb.com/photos/features/Port-Angeles-ProGRT-Practice,1287/Hey-ladies,6383/sspomer,2
 https://web.archive.org/web/20101219145521/http://transitionbikes.com/Blog.cfm
 http://dirt.mpora.com/news/pro-grt-port-angeles-results.html
 http://www.vitalmtb.com/videos/features/Port-Angeles-ProGRT-Finals-Photo-Slideshow,2246/sspomer,2
 http://www.cyclingnews.com/races/us-pro-grt-1-northwest-cup-ne/results
 http://www.canadiancyclist.com/dailynews.php?id=18838
 http://www.pinkbike.com/photo/4970329/
 https://web.archive.org/web/20110415031112/http://bicycling.com/blogs/mbword/2010/04/27/moseley-atkinson-win-pro-grt-races/
 http://www.vitalmtb.com/videos/member/ProGRT-2010-Port-Angeles,2332/bturman,109

MARIBOR
 http://dirt.mpora.com/news/dirt-tv-maribor-world-cup-finals.html
 http://www.pinkbike.com/news/maribor-specialized-yeti-intensa-2010.html
 http://transcendmagazine.com/gallery/album01/FRA5396
 http://dirt.mpora.com/news/dirt-tv-maribor-wc-qualifying.html
 https://web.archive.org/web/20110720124433/http://dirt.mpora.com/news/maribor-world-cup-video-2.html
 http://www.pinkbike.com/news/maribor-DH-finals-2010.html

PRO GRT/PLATTEKILL
 http://www.pinkbike.com/news/pro-grt-plattekill-day-1-2010.html
 http://www.pinkbike.com/news/pro-grt-plattekill-finals-2010.html
 http://www.sicklines.com/2010/05/25/khs-gravity-open-at-plattekill-results-pro-grt-2/

US OPEN
 https://web.archive.org/web/20100602070458/http://dirt.mpora.com/news/video-open-day-2.html
 http://www.vitalmtb.com/photos/features/2010-US-Open-Friday,1361/Transition-Racing-Crew,7700/sspomer,2
 http://www.pinkbike.com/news/us-open-day-3-photos-2010.html
 http://www.vitalmtb.com/photos/features/2010-US-Open-Saturday,1363/Bryn-Atkinson,7737/sspomer,2
 http://www.vitalmtb.com/videos/features/2010-US-Open-of-Mountain-Biking,2623/Lucent,16
 http://www.pinkbike.com/video/141738/
 http://www.pinkbike.com/news/bryn-atkinson-bike-check-2010.html

FORT WILLIAM
 http://www.vitalmtb.com/photos/features/2010-Fort-William-World-Cup-Day-2,1375/Bryn-Atkinson,8104/sspomer,2
 http://dirt.mpora.com/news/dirttv-fort-william-friday-practise.html

LEOGANG
 http://www.vitalmtb.com/videos/member/World-Cup-3-Day-2-Leogang,2830/MTBCUTtv,6
 https://web.archive.org/web/20101212022102/http://dirt.mpora.com/news/triride-leogang-friday-practise.html
 https://web.archive.org/web/20101210090425/http://dirt.mpora.com/news/tri-ride-world-cup-3-qualifyingleogang.html
 https://web.archive.org/web/20101110034204/http://dirt.mpora.com/news/dirttv-world-cup-3-qualifyingleogang.html
 https://web.archive.org/web/20101112142325/http://dirt.mpora.com/news/dirttvsaturday-qualifying-chit-chat-leogang.html

NORTHSTAR
 https://web.archive.org/web/20101121172244/http://declinemagazine.com/content.php?itemid=5074
 http://progrt.blogspot.com/2010/06/pro-grt-tahoe-recap.html
 http://mbaction.com/ME2/dirmod.asp?sid=&nm=&type=news&mod=News&mid=9A02E3B96F2A415ABC72CB5F516B4C10&tier=3&nid=AE00A748E0184CB29EE1FD1024B33469
 http://www.usacycling.org/news/user/story.php?id=5088

CHAMPERY
 http://www.pinkbike.com/news/champery-world-cup-chat-2010.html
 http://dirt.mpora.com/news/dirt-tv-champery-thursday-practice.html
 http://www.pinkbike.com/news/martin-steffen-Champery-2010.html

VAL DI SOLE
 https://web.archive.org/web/20101009024033/http://dirt.mpora.com/news/dirttv-val-di-sole-wc-practise.html
 http://www.pinkbike.com/news/val-di-sole-race-video-2010.html?trk=rss
 http://www.zapiks.fr/wc5-val-di-sole-qualificatio-1.html

WHISTLER
 https://web.archive.org/web/20100915054420/http://dirt.mpora.com/news/dirttv-crankworx-slalom-2.html
 https://web.archive.org/web/20100914084646/http://dirt.mpora.com/news/lopes-chausson-win-crankworx-airdh.html
 http://www.vitalmtb.com/videos/member/Crankworx-Epic-Action-Blog-Day-5,3488/bikelife,3900
 http://www.pinkbike.com/photo/5473189/
 https://www.youtube.com/watch?v=pTqh0ju5Z2o&feature=player_embedded#!

WINDHAM
 http://www.vitalmtb.com/videos/member/Transition-Racing-at-Windham-World-Cup-Finals,3666/amado,768
 http://www.vitalmtb.com/photos/features/Windham-World-Cup-Day-3,1547/Slideshow,10651/sspomer,2

MT ST ANNE
 http://www.pinkbike.com/news/transition-world-champs-2010.html

1982 births
Living people
Australian male cyclists
Downhill mountain bikers
Four-cross mountain bikers
Sportspeople from Canberra
Sportspeople from Townsville
People from the Blue Mountains (New South Wales)
Sportsmen from the Australian Capital Territory
Cyclists from the Australian Capital Territory
Australian mountain bikers